The 1959 Middle Tennessee Blue Raiders football team represented the Middle Tennessee State College—now known as Middle Tennessee State University—as a member of the Ohio Valley Conference (OVC) during the 1959 NCAA College Division football season. Middle Tennessee was invited to the Tangerine Bowl, where they beat . The team's captains were B. Pitts and Brady Luckett.

Schedule

References

Middle Tennessee
College football undefeated seasons
Middle Tennessee Blue Raiders football seasons
Ohio Valley Conference football champion seasons
Citrus Bowl champion seasons
Middle Tennessee Blue Raiders football